Michel Fontaine (born 6 May 1952 in Romans-sur-Isère, France) was a member of the Senate of France. He was elected in 2011 as one of three senators for the overseas  department of Réunion. He was not re-elected in 2017. A radiologist by profession, he is a member of Les Républicains. He has also been the mayor of Saint-Pierre, Réunion since 2001.

External links
FONTAINE Michel, French Senate website

1952 births
Living people
French Senators of the Fifth Republic
Senators of Réunion
The Republicans (France) politicians
Mayors of places in Réunion
People from Romans-sur-Isère